Zlataritsa is a very remote village in Belitsa Municipality, in Blagoevgrad Province, Bulgaria. It is located approximately 33 kilometers east from Belitsa and 93 kilometers southeast from Sofia highly in the Rhodope Mountains. As of 2010 it had a population of 133 people. The population is Muslim of pomak origin. There is a reservoir in the area.

References

Villages in Blagoevgrad Province

bg:Златарица